
The Viljandi Folk Music Festival is a music festival in Estonia with a central focus on European folk music. It is traditionally held during the last weekend of July, when the otherwise quiet city of Viljandi is completely transformed as the small city center is suddenly flooded with people. The main attraction of the festival is the friendly atmosphere. Over 25,000 people attend the concerts every year, but many more just come to take part in the festivities. As such, it is the largest annual music festival in Estonia, and one of the largest folk music festivals in Europe.

Highlights of past festivals

 IX Viljandi Folk Music Festival July 26–29, 2001.Headlined by Yat-Kha (Tuva), Väsen (Sweden), Fluxus (Belgium), Gerry O'Connor & Desi Wilkinson (Ireland).
 X Viljandi Folk Music Festival July 25–28, 2002.Headlined by Talitha MacKenzie (Scotland), Gjallarhorn (Finland), Atalyja (Lithuania), Fanfara de la Chetris (Romania).
 XI Viljandi Folk Music Festival July 24–27, 2003.Headlined by Haydamaky (Ukraine), Värttinä (Finland), Galldubh (Ireland), Romano Drom (Hungary), Alberto Gutierrez et Maquinolandela (Cuba).
 XII Viljandi Folk Music Festival July 22–25, 2004.Headlined by Esma Redzepova (Macedonia), Esta (Israel), JPP (Finland), Mary Youngblood (USA), Dorsa (Northern Ireland), and BuB (Belgium).
 XIII Viljandi Folk Music Festival July 28–31, 2005.Headlined by Brolum (Scotland), Henrik Jansberg Quartet (Denmark), Fiddlesong (Canada), Osimira (Belarus).
 XIV Viljandi Folk Music Festival July 20–23, 2006.Headlined by Altan (Ireland), Filska (Shetland islands), Evgenij Genev & Balkan Folk Acoustic (Bulgaria), Csik Band (Hungary), Tummel (Sweden)

References

External links 

Official website of the Estonian Traditional Music Center
XVII Viljandi Folk Music Festival 2009
Viljandi folk music festival 2007

Viljandi
Tourist attractions in Viljandi County
Music festivals established in 1993
Folk festivals in Estonia
Summer events in Estonia
Estonian folk music